Erricos Andreou (15 December 1938 –  21 January 2023) was a Greek film director and screenwriter known for such films as The Hook, Act of Reprisal and Fatal Relationship.

References

External links

1938 births
2023 deaths
Greek film directors
Greek male screenwriters
Giallo film directors
People from Johannesburg